Heel stick wounds are a cutaneous condition characterized by a break in the skin caused by neonatal heel prick. The heel stick is an important medical screening for the child and causes low levels of pain.

See also 
 Hydroa vacciniforme
 List of cutaneous conditions

References 

Skin conditions resulting from physical factors